The 2004 Mexican Figure Skating Championships took place in Guadalajara. Skaters competed in the disciplines of men's singles and ladies' singles on the senior level. The results were used to choose the Mexican teams to the 2004 World Championships and the 2004 Four Continents Championships.

Senior results

Men

Ladies

External links
 results

Mexican Figure Skating Championships, 2004
Mex
Figure Skating Championships, 2004
Fig
Mexican Figure Skating Championships